Ampology is the fifth compilation album by Australian rock group Hoodoo Gurus. The album spans the group's career from their first single, "Leilani" in October 1982 through to "Real Deal" in 1997.  The album peaked at number 76 on the ARIA charts.

Track listing

Album credits 
Credited to:
 Mark Opitz - Producer
 Ed Stasium - Producer
 Alan Thorne - Producer
 Charles Fisher - Producer
 Don Bartley - remastering
 Karen Glauber - liner Notes
 Andrzej Liguz - photography
 Francine McDougall - photography
 Adrienne Overall - photography, back cover
 Libby Blainey - artwork

Charts

References 

Hoodoo Gurus albums
Compilation albums by Australian artists
2000 compilation albums